The fourth government of Israel was formed by David Ben-Gurion during the second Knesset on 24 December 1952.

History
Ben-Gurion dropped the ultra-orthodox parties Agudat Yisrael and Poalei Agudat Yisrael from his coalition and replaced them with the General Zionists and the Progressive Party, who formed the government together with Mapai, Mizrachi, Hapoel HaMizrachi, the Democratic List for Israeli Arabs, Progress and Work and Agriculture and Development.

The government fell when Ben-Gurion resigned on 6 December 1953 and moved to the Negev kibbutz of Sde Boker.

References

External links
Knesset 2: Government 4 Knesset website

 04
1952 establishments in Israel
1953 disestablishments in Israel
Cabinets established in 1952
Cabinets disestablished in 1953
1952 in Israeli politics
1953 in Israeli politics
1954 in Israeli politics
 04